Die Arche (The Ark) is a 1919 silent science fiction film starring Leo Connard and directed by Richard Oswald. It is a two-part German epic based upon a novel by Werner Scheff. It follows the story of a near future in which civilization has been destroyed.

Cast

References

External links 
 

1919 films
1910s science fiction films
German science fiction films
Films of the Weimar Republic
German black-and-white films
German silent feature films
Apocalyptic films
Films directed by Richard Oswald
Comets in film
1910s German films
Silent science fiction films